60S ribosomal protein L10 is a protein that in humans is encoded by the RPL10 gene.

Function 

Ribosomes, the organelles that catalyze protein synthesis, consist of a small 40S subunit and a large 60S subunit. Together these subunits are composed of 4 RNA species and approximately 80 structurally distinct proteins. This gene encodes a ribosomal protein that is a component of the 60S subunit. The protein belongs to the L10E family of ribosomal proteins. It is located in the cytoplasm. In vitro studies have shown that the chicken protein can bind to c-Jun and can repress c-Jun-mediated transcriptional activation, but these activities have not been demonstrated in vivo. This gene was initially identified as a candidate for a Wilms tumor suppressor gene, but later studies determined that this gene is not involved in the suppression of Wilms tumor. This gene has been referred to as 'laminin receptor homolog' because a chimeric transcript consisting of sequence from this gene and sequence from the laminin receptor gene was isolated; however, it is not believed that this gene encodes a laminin receptor. Transcript variants utilizing alternative polyA signals exist. The variant with the longest 3' UTR overlaps the deoxyribonuclease I-like 1 gene on the opposite strand. This gene is co-transcribed with the small nucleolar RNA gene U70, which is located in its fifth intron. As is typical for genes encoding ribosomal proteins, there are multiple processed pseudogenes of this gene dispersed through the genome.

Interactions 

RPL10 has been shown to interact with YES1.

References

Further reading 

 
 
 
 
 
 
 
 
 
 
 
 
 
 
 
 
 
 

Ribosomal proteins